William Borthwick may refer to:

William Borthwick (mayor) (1848–1928), mayor of Ottawa, 1895–1896
Bill Borthwick (1924–2001), Australian politician
William Borthwick, 1st Lord Borthwick (died 1458), Scottish peer and ambassador
William Borthwick, 2nd Lord Borthwick (died 1483), Scottish ambassador to England
William Borthwick, 3rd Lord Borthwick (died 1503), Scottish nobleman and ambassador
William Borthwick, 4th Lord Borthwick (died 1542), Scottish nobleman
William Borthwick (Dorset politician) (1879–1956), British Army Captain and barrister
William Jason Maxwell Borthwick (1910–1998), British barrister and Royal Naval Volunteer Reserve officer
William Borthwick (surgeon) (1641–1689), Scottish surgeon

See also
Borthwick (surname)